Kataysky District is an administrative and municipal district (raion), one of the twenty-four in Kurgan Oblast, Russia. It is located in the northwest of the oblast. Its administrative center is the town of Kataysk. Population:  28,099 (2002 Census);  The population of Kataysk accounts for 58.4% of the district's total population.

References

Notes

Sources

Districts of Kurgan Oblast